Andrew Cosby is an American comic book creator, film producer, and screenwriter. He is the co-creator of the hit SyFy TV series Eureka, and the co-founder of Boom! Studios.

Malibu Comics

Cosby worked at Malibu Comics from 1993 to 1995, at which time he left the company to pursue a career in feature films and was involved producing the feature film adaptation of Mage by comic book creator Matt Wagner with Spyglass Entertainment, and had various projects with Mike Medavoy (Phoenix Pictures), Mark Canton (The Canton Company), Akiva Goldsman, and Casey Silver.

BOOM! Studios
In 2005, Cosby launched BOOM! Studios, the award-winning comic book publishing company known for Pixar comics, Muppets comic books based on Mickey Mouse and Donald Duck, series featuring Warhammer and Warhammer 40,000 from Games Workshop, as well as 28 Days Later comic books, Die Hard comic books, and a sequential panel-to-panel graphic rendition of Do Androids Dream of Electric Sheep.

Boom's first published comic was Zombie Tales, which Cosby created.

Dark Horse Comics

Working with Mike Richardson and Dark Horse, Cosby set up Damn Nation at MTV Films/Paramount Pictures, a comic book Cosby created and was subsequently attached to write and produce. Damn Nation was Cosby's first published comic book. He then went on to create two children's books for Dark Horse, Dreadful Ed and Mary Scary.

Stranger Comics

In 2010, Cosby began working with Sebastian Jones' Stranger Comics and is currently helping launch several of their properties as feature films, including The Untamed, which Cosby is producing.

Feature films

Cosby produced the 2013 film 2 Guns. He is producing the feature film adaptation of Mage, by Matt Wagner, Talent, and Tag with Marc Platt Productions and Universal Studios, Damn Nation at MTV Films/Paramount Pictures, The Nightmare of Hugo Baring with Mike Medavoy (Phoenix Pictures), The Foundation at Paramount, Kringle with Mark Canton (The Canton Company), Akiva Goldsman, Creature Tech with Fox, Unusual Suspects with Lloyd Levin and Casey Silver, Saints Row with Lloyd Levin, based on the top-selling THQ video game, The Untamed, based on the Stranger Comics graphic novel, and Among the Dead with Nick Spicer and XYZ Films. Cosby received sole script credit for 2019's Hellboy film, a reboot of the Hellboy film series. Christopher Golden and Mike Mignola also contributed to the script, though both went uncredited. In October 2017, it was announced that Cosby would write the script for the Silver film.

Television
Cosby co-created the UPN horror series Haunted and is the co-creator of the record-breaking Syfy TV show Eureka, which concluded its fifth and final season in July 2012.

Awards and nominations

References

Living people
American entertainment industry businesspeople
Comic book company founders
American film producers
Year of birth missing (living people)